East Gaston High School (also referred to as East Gaston or EGHS) is a public high school that is part of the Gaston County Schools district and is located in Mount Holly, North Carolina. Its attendance range covers northeastern Gaston County and includes western portions of Mount Holly, the town of Stanley and the communities of Mountain Island, Alexis, Lucia, Dallas, as well as the surrounding rural areas in Gaston County. The school was established in 1972 when high schools in the neighboring communities of Mount Holly and Stanley were consolidated. Feeder middle schools are Stanley and Mt. Holly, with the surrounding Springfield Elementary School also being within the area.

At one point, East Gaston was the largest high school in Gaston County. However, it lost a significant portion of its attendance zone when Stuart W. Cramer High School opened in nearby Cramerton.

Extracurricular activities
The East Gaston athletic teams compete in the Big South 2A/3A Conference, which includes the following teams, with South Point being their main rival:

 Ashbrook Green Wave
 East Gaston Warriors
 Forestview Jaguars
 Hunter Huss Huskies
 Lake Norman Charter Knights
 North Gaston Wildcats
 South Point Red Raiders

References

External links
 Gaston County official website

Public high schools in North Carolina
Schools in Gaston County, North Carolina